Turkey competed at the 2020 Summer Olympics in Tokyo. Originally scheduled to take place from 24 July to 9 August 2020, the Games were postponed to 23 July to 8 August 2021, due to the COVID-19 pandemic. Since the nation's official debut in 1908, Turkish athletes have appeared in every edition of the Summer Olympic Games, except the 1920 Summer Olympics in Antwerp, the 1932 Summer Olympics in Los Angeles at the period of worldwide Great Depression, and the 1980 Summer Olympics in Moscow because of its support for the United States-led boycott.

Medalists

| width="78%" align="left" valign="top" |

| width="22%" align="left" valign="top" |

Competitors

The following is the list of number of competitors participating in the Games:

Archery

Two Turkish archers booked Olympic places in the men’s individual recurve and the women's individual recurve by finishing in the top 4 of the Europe Continental Qualification Tournament in Antalya, Turkey, thereby also qualifying for the Mixed Team Event.

Athletics

Turkish athletes further achieved the entry standards, either by qualifying time or by world ranking, in the following track and field events (up to a maximum of 3 athletes in each event):

Track & road events
Men

Women

Field events

Badminton

Turkey entered one female player into the Olympic tournament based on the BWF Race to Tokyo Rankings.

Boxing

Turkey entered one male boxer into the Olympic tournament. Batuhan Çiftçi scored a round-of-16 victory to secure a spot in the men's flyweight division at the 2020 European Qualification Tournament in London, United Kingdom. At the same tournament, Buse Naz Çakıroğlu scored a quarterfinal victory to secure a spot in  the women's flyweight division.

Men

Women

Cycling

Road
Turkey entered two riders to compete in the men's Olympic road race, by virtue of their top 50 national finish (for men) in the UCI World Ranking.

Fencing

Turkey entered one fencer into the Olympic competition. Rio 2016 Olympian İrem Karamete claimed a spot in the women's foil as one of the two highest-ranked fencers vying for qualification from Europe in the FIE Adjusted Official Rankings.

Gymnastics

Artistic
Turkey entered three artistic gymnasts into the Olympic competition. Rio 2016 Olympian Ferhat Arıcan and rookie Nazlı Savranbaşı finished among the top twelve eligible for qualification in the men's and among the top twenty in the women's individual all-around and apparatus events, respectively, to book their spots on the Turkish roster at the 2019 World Championships in Stuttgart, Germany. Meanwhile, Ahmet Önder and İbrahim Çolak secured spots available for individual-based gymnasts, neither part of the team nor qualified through the all-around, in the parallel bars and rings exercises, respectively, at the same tournament.

Men

Women

Judo
 
Turkey entered five judoka (four men and one women) into the Olympic tournament based on the International Judo Federation Olympics Individual Ranking.

Karate
 
Turkey entered seven karateka into the inaugural Olympic tournament. 2019 European Games medalists Uğur Aktaş (men's +75 kg), Ali Sofuoğlu (men's kata), Serap Özçelik (women's 55 kg), Merve Çoban (women's 61 kg), and Meltem Hocaoğlu (women's +61 kg) qualified directly for their respective kumite and kata categories by finishing among the top four karateka at the end of the combined WKF Olympic Rankings.

Kumite

Kata

Modern pentathlon
 
Turkey athletes qualified for the following spots to compete in modern pentathlon. İlke Özyüksel confirmed places each in the women's event, after booked the sixth of eight available spots at world ranking.

Rowing

Turkey qualified one boat in the men's single sculls for the Games by finishing sixth in the A-final and securing the second of three berths available at the 2021 FISA European Olympic Qualification Regatta in Varese, Italy.

Qualification Legend: FA=Final A (medal); FB=Final B (non-medal); FC=Final C (non-medal); FD=Final D (non-medal); FE=Final E (non-medal); FF=Final F (non-medal); SA/B=Semifinals A/B; SC/D=Semifinals C/D; SE/F=Semifinals E/F; QF=Quarterfinals; R=Repechage

Sailing

Turkish sailors qualified one boat in each of the following classes through the 2018 Sailing World Championships, the class-associated Worlds, and the continental regattas.

Two-time Olympian Alican Kaynar (Finn), 470 crew brothers Deniz and Ateş Çınar, and Rio 2016 windsurfer Dilara Uralp were selected to the Turkish roster under the qualifying merit, while rookie Ecem Güzel beat her rival Nazlı Çağla Dönertaş to top the country's Laser Radial spot with a tenth place overall at the 2019 World Championships in Sakaiminato.

Men

Women

M = Medal race; EL = Eliminated – did not advance into the medal race

Shooting

Turkish shooters achieved quota places for the following events by virtue of their best finishes at the 2018 ISSF World Championships, the 2019 ISSF World Cup series, European Championships or Games, and European Qualifying Tournament, as long as they obtained a minimum qualifying score (MQS) by May 31, 2020.

Swimming

Turkish swimmers further achieved qualifying standards in the following events (up to a maximum of 2 swimmers in each event at the Olympic Qualifying Time (OQT), and potentially 1 at the Olympic Selection Time (OST)):

Men

Women

Taekwondo

Turkey entered five athletes into the taekwondo competition at the Games. Rukiye Yıldırım (women's 49 kg), Hatice Kübra İlgün (women's 57 kg), double Olympic medalist Nur Tatar (women's 67 kg), and Nafia Kuş (women's +67 kg) qualified directly for their respective weight classes by finishing among the top five taekwondo practitioners at the end of the WT Olympic Rankings. Meanwhile, Hakan Reçber scored a semifinal victory in the men's lightweight category (68 kg) to book the remaining spot on the Turkish taekwondo squad at the 2021 European Qualification Tournament in Sofia, Bulgaria.

Volleyball

Indoor
Summary

Women's tournament

Turkey women's volleyball team qualified for the Olympics by winning the final match and securing an outright berth at the European Olympic Qualification Tournament in Apeldoorn, Netherlands, marking the country's recurrence to the sport after an eight-year absence.

Team roster

Group play

Quarter-final

Weightlifting

Turkish weightlifters qualified for three quota places at the games, based on the Tokyo 2020 Rankings Qualification List of 11 June 2021.

Wrestling

Turkey qualified nine wrestlers for each of the following classes into the Olympic competition. Four of them finished among the top six to book Olympic spots in the men's freestyle (57 and 125 kg) and men's Greco-Roman (97 and 130 kg) wrestling at the 2019 World Championships, while four additional licenses were awarded to the Turkish wrestlers, who progressed to the top two finals of their respective weight categories at the 2021 European Olympic Qualification Tournament in Budapest, Hungary. Another Turkish wrestler claimed one of the remaining slots in the women's freestyle 76 kg to complete the nation's roster at the 2021 World Qualification Tournament in Sofia, Bulgaria.

Freestyle

Greco-Roman

See also
 Turkey at the 2020 Summer Paralympics

References

Nations at the 2020 Summer Olympics
2020
2021 in Turkish sport